James Holzhauer (born August 6, 1984) is an American game show contestant and professional sports gambler. He is the third-highest-earning American game show contestant of all time and is best known for his 32-game winning streak as champion on the quiz show Jeopardy! from April to June 2019, during which he set multiple single-game records for winnings, and for winning the following Tournament of Champions that November.

Holzhauer won $2,464,216 in his 33 appearances, making him the second-highest winner in Jeopardy! regular-play (non-tournament) winnings (behind only Ken Jennings, who won $2,522,700 in 2004) and, at the time, second in number of games won (again behind only Jennings) although he has since been surpassed by Matt Amodio (38 games) and Amy Schneider (40). His $250,000 top prize in the Tournament of Champions and $250,000 runner-up prize in the Greatest of All Time Tournament brought his total to $2,964,216, making him still the third-highest winning Jeopardy! contestant, behind Jennings and Brad Rutter. Holzhauer also set the single-game winnings record with $131,127. Based on his success on Jeopardy!, he has been nicknamed "Jeopardy James".

Early life and education
Born August 6, 1984, Holzhauer was born and raised in Naperville, Illinois. His father was a German immigrant. His grandmother was Japanese and spoke very little English; he had promised her that he would appear on Jeopardy! before she died. In 1989, when he was four, his teacher was astounded by his arithmetic abilities and developed advanced classwork just for him. At age seven, he was moved up to a fifth-grade math class, and at his mother's urging he skipped second grade. He consistently got A's on math tests and competed on the Naperville North High School math team.

Despite high marks on individual tests, he was a C student overall, as he often skipped class and homework on the grounds that he could use the time more "productively", such as playing online poker. Holzhauer memorized obscure baseball and professional wrestling statistics, prompting his parents to reprimand him for "wasting his life" learning about sports.

Holzhauer was a member of the Worldwide Youth in Science and Engineering Team that won the state competition at the University of Illinois Urbana-Champaign; he contributed by taking first place in physics and second in math. He graduated with a Bachelor of Science degree in mathematics in 2005.

Game show appearances

The Chase

Holzhauer appeared on the American version of the quiz show The Chase on September 2, 2014, internationally produced by ITV Studios. In his first round, a one-minute round called the Cash Builder, he correctly answered 12 questions out of 13 posed by host Brooke Burns; the last question was asked just before time expired and was quickly passed on by Holzhauer. His score set a record for the Cash Builder that was never surpassed during the show's run.

In his second round, he faced Mark Labbett to determine whether he would advance to the final round and add money to the team prize pool. Holzhauer had a choice of three amounts to play for: $60,000 based on his score in the Cash Builder, $30,000 to reduce the difficulty of the round; and $120,000, which would increase the difficulty. He chose to play for $60,000; after the show he said that the odds did not favor playing for the maximum amount and that it was not worth the gamble.

The Chase was played head-to-head, with the players using hidden buttons to select multiple-choice answers. Holzhauer advanced to the finals and added to the prize pool with a score of five right and one wrong. Labbett scored a perfect five, with his final answer not revealed since Holzhauer had already achieved the necessary points to win the round.

In the Final Chase round (as team leader with two other contestants also participating), Holzhauer's team defeated Labbett by a score of 26 to 9, earning him a $58,333.33 share of the $175,000 team prize pool. By answering 19 questions correctly for his team, he set a Final Chase record, which was also never surpassed.

Bob Boden, the producer of The Chase, was impressed by his performance and had Holzhauer audition to join the show as a colleague of Labbett. In July 2020, Holzhauer and several other famous game show contestants were said to be in negotiations to become chasers for a potential reboot of The Chase, which would be produced for ABC. The reboot starring Holzhauer, Ken Jennings, and Brad Rutter premiered January 7, 2021 on ABC.

500 Questions
Holzhauer appeared on the American quiz show 500 Questions on May 22, 2015. This show did not allow the challenger to replace the champion unless the champion answered three questions wrong in a row. The incumbent champion, Steve Bahnaman, prevailed over Holzhauer, who did not receive any winnings.

Jeopardy!

Holzhauer appeared on 33 episodes of Season 35 of the American quiz show Jeopardy!, from April 4 to June 3, 2019. During his first game, he won $43,680, the largest single-game total to that point in Season 35. In his fourth game, which aired on April 9, he broke the previous single-game Jeopardy! winnings record ($77,000, set by Roger Craig in 2010) by winning $110,914.

During his 33 appearances, Holzhauer exceeded Craig's single-day total 16 times (see table below), including a new all-time record set on April 17, when he won $131,127. He is also the first and only player to win $100,000 or more in a single episode, a feat he accomplished six times. His $298,687 total winnings across his first five days surpassed the five-day record set by Frank Spangenberg in 1990 before the changes in the values of the clues. Holzhauer is the only contestant to date to do so. He won a total of $2,464,216, averaging $75,362 per episode—a 33-day average that nearly equaled the previous all-time single-day record. Fellow Jeopardy! champion Ken Jennings has likened this feat to "a basketball player notching 70-point games for an entire season or a baseball player hitting for the cycle in every game". Holzhauer's average winnings were more than the estimated $43,000 per episode that host Alex Trebek earned.

Holzhauer was defeated in his 33rd game, which aired on June 3, 2019, and was watched by 14.5 million people. The winner, Emma Boettcher, used many of the same strategies as Holzhauer.

In July 2019, Jeopardy! confirmed that Holzhauer would return for the Tournament of Champions in November. Holzhauer won both his quarterfinal and semifinal games to advance to the final round, which featured a rematch against Boettcher, who was invited separately and also won her first two tournament games. Holzhauer won the two-day final, winning the first game by a larger margin than Boettcher won the second and claiming the $250,000 top prize. The next week, Jeopardy! announced that Holzhauer would compete against Jennings and Rutter in prime-time specials for a million-dollar prize in Jeopardy! The Greatest of All Time, which aired in January 2020. Holzhauer won one match in the tournament, but lost to Jennings in the others, and received the runner-up prize of $250,000.

Regular play winnings

Tournaments

Strategies
Holzhauer took a two-pronged approach to play. He selected the highest-value clues first in an attempt to maximize the money he had available to wager when he hit a Daily Double. This strategy does not always work, as a Daily Double is more likely to be behind a high-value clue, and often he hit the Daily Double before accumulating a large sum to wager. On Daily Doubles and during Final Jeopardy! clues, Holzhauer bet aggressively; his average wager on Daily Doubles was $9,000.

While aggressive betting is disadvantageous if a player responds incorrectly, Holzhauer was correct on 72 of the 76 Daily Doubles he hit (94.7%). This strategy was not entirely new; Alex Jacob, also a professional gambler, used a similar strategy in his six regular-play wins in April 2015 and the 2015 Tournament of Champions, which he won.

Excluding Daily Doubles and Final Jeopardy! wagers, Holzhauer's average score of $30,800 during his 32-episode winning streak (57% of the $54,000 available in each game) is higher than the $28,786 averaged by Jennings, who was far more conservative in his wagering; Holzhauer considered it more logical to make large bets that will usually pay off, since, during the first 25 episodes of his winning streak, he averaged 35.5 correct and only 1.04 wrong responses per game. On the episode he lost, he did not respond to any clues incorrectly. He credited reading fact books written for children, with their heavy use of infographics, with allowing him to learn vast amounts of information in an easily digestible manner. He took a year off from his occupation as a sports gambler to study for Jeopardy!.

Response to game play
Holzhauer's record-breaking winning streak attracted considerable reaction and media attention. When Holzhauer reached $1 million, Craig, who held the single-game winnings record before Holzhauer, said, "To me, it's clear that he's one of the top players of all time already." Jennings said he was "just gobsmacked by James", adding, "It's absolutely insane what he's doing." Of Holzhauer's strategies, Jennings said, "he's got these incredibly confident wagers. He's maximizing money. He can make two or three times what any other player ever has with that same level of play, which again is top-shelf. He's as good as anybody." Jennings adopted Holzhauer's wagering strategy in the Greatest of All Time tournament, a factor in his victory. Labbett, meanwhile, recalled Holzhauer's The Chase appearance as "the worst beating I've ever had", adding, "I've got to give Jeopardy! immense credit, and The Chase U.S.A. In Britain or Australia, James would not have made it onto television, because he's just too damn good. They would never have him on."

Television ratings
Nielsen ratings for Jeopardy! rose 11% nationally during the first two weeks of Holzhauer's run and as much as 50% in select local markets, with a continuing upward trend over the course of his streak; by the fourth week of his run, ratings were up 30% nationwide and had doubled in select markets. Former Game Show Network executive Bob Boden said the ratings would help compensate for any short-term financial losses Holzhauer's run caused, and that the show's profitability up to this point (Jeopardy! and sister program Wheel of Fortune combined generate approximately $125 million in profit) would allow them to absorb the increased payouts. It was also noted that the improved ratings would not immediately allow the show to increase advertising rates, since those are set on a season-by-season basis as part of long-term ad buys.

The highest-rated episode during Holzhauer's run was his final one, which at 14.5 million same-day viewers was the highest-rated episode since Jennings's last episode in 2004, the highest-rated episode of a syndicated show that season and the third-most-watched episode of a running series in the 2018–19 season (behind only the series-ending "The Stockholm Syndrome" episode of The Big Bang Theory and an episode of 60 Minutes that had led out of an NFL on CBS contest), not counting DVR or streaming views, the latter of which Jeopardy! does not offer. The episode had been spoiled several hours before it aired on most affiliate stations; Sports Illustrated credited the spoilers with creating buzz, counteracting the conventional wisdom that people would not tune in without the element of surprise. Even if the result had not been spoiled, Holzhauer was on pace to break Jennings's regular-play record that day had he won, which might also have had a part in the increased ratings.

Gambling career
While a student at the University of Illinois at Urbana–Champaign, Holzhauer played hearts and spades at a card club. The twice-a-week club quickly turned into a five-day-a-week home poker game with a 10-cent ante and $2 maximum bets. The poker game is where Holzhauer began gambling but he grew his sports betting bankroll in the 2006 World Baseball Classic. Believing the round-robin format of the tournament and variance in baseball had skewed the odds, he bet heavily on each team except the US and the Dominican Republic to win the tournament. After graduating from college, Holzhauer moved to Las Vegas in 2008 to bet professionally on sports. He says he has built predictive models for baseball, NFL, and college basketball, but now focuses largely on in-game betting.

Holzhauer debuted at the World Series of Poker in 2019. In his first event, he finished 454th out of approximately 1,800 contestants and did not win any prize money (he would have needed to finish at 281st or higher to win any prize money). His second event was a tag-team match in which he partnered with Mike Sexton. He ultimately was knocked out as a solo contestant in round 17 of the tournament, with his most notable prize win being a $600 profit for finishing 92nd out of 1,867 on a No-Limit Hold'em Super Turbo Bounty game.

Personal life
On September 8, 2012, Holzhauer married Melissa Sassin, a tutor from Seattle, Washington. Sassin has also been a game show contestant, appearing on Who Wants to Be a Millionaire in 2014 and winning $28,800. Their daughter, Natasha, was born on November 9, 2014.

Holzhauer frequently made inside references to important dates in his life with his Jeopardy! wagers, including family members' birthdays, his anniversary, and the date of the 2017 Las Vegas shooting.

Holzhauer is a lifelong fan of the Chicago Cubs; he has said his dream job is a front-office position with the team and has actively sought employment in Major League Baseball. Holzhauer has said that he was contractually obligated to a non-compete clause in an agreement with the Jeopardy! producers; it expired in January 2020.

Philanthropy
Holzhauer said he intended to donate some of his Jeopardy! winnings to Las Vegas children's charities. On April 7, 2019, he donated $10,000 to a Las Vegas organization for displaced teens. On May 2, 2019, he was awarded a key to the Las Vegas Strip for his success on Jeopardy! and for his donations to children's charity organizations and other nonprofit organizations in the Las Vegas area. In mid-2019, Holzhauer donated $1,109.14 (representing his daughter's birthday) to the 2019 Naperville Pancreatic Cancer Reach Walk in Illinois, in Alex Trebek's name. On June 24, 2019, he began participating in World Series of Poker events in Las Vegas. He plans to donate half his winnings to the Las Vegas nonprofit Project 150, which helps homeless, displaced and disadvantaged high school students.

See also 
 List of notable Jeopardy! contestants
 Strategies and skills of Jeopardy! champions

References

External links
 
 

Living people
1984 births
American gamblers
American people of German descent
American people of Japanese descent
Jeopardy! contestants
Mass media people from Illinois
People from Las Vegas
People from Naperville, Illinois
University of Illinois Urbana-Champaign alumni